José María Vilches (1936–1984) was a Spanish-born stage film and television actor. He settled in Argentina.

Selected filmography
 Back to the Door (1959)

References

Bibliography
 Florentino Soria. José María Forqué. Editora Regional de Murcia, 1990.

External links

1936 births
1984 deaths
Spanish male film actors
Spanish male stage actors
Argentine male film actors
Argentine male stage actors
Spanish emigrants to Argentina
People from Alcalá de Henares